The  Australian International Documentary Conference (AIDC) is an Australian conference for the promotion of documentary, factual and unscripted screen content, regarded as one of two major national conferences for filmmakers.

History
First established in 1987, AIDC began life as a biennial conference. Over time the event has moved to several different regions in Australia, mostly being held in capital cities. Over the years it has grown from being a small conference with a few international guests, to being a major annual international event. Serving both the commercial and creative needs of the industry, the conference provides a marketplace for documentary product for national and international buyers and distributors, showcases the work of Australian and international documentary makers, and creates a forum to discuss content, craft, technology and future directions.

It was as a result of the first AIDC, held in 1987 at McLaren Vale, in the heart of South Australia's wine growing region, that the ABC introduced its pre-sale commissioning system.

It was held in Melbourne in 2006 (and possibly previous to this), before relocating back to Adelaide for five successful years until 2015, again moving to Melbourne in 2016. In that year it was held at the Australian Centre for the Moving Image (ACMI).

Description
AIDC is a not-for-profit organisation committed to the sustainability of documentary, factual and unscripted storytelling. Its goal is to connect creators, purveyors and viewers of non-fiction screen content in ways that promote business, inspire creativity and ignite social change.

 the Conference is regarded as one of two major annual conferences for filmmakers, the other being the Screen Makers Conference held in Adelaide.

List of Conferences

The conference was held online in 2021 due to the COVID-19 pandemic in Australia.

The Stanley Hawes Award

The annual Stanley Hawes Award for contribution to the documentary in Australia is announced at each AIDC.

The Stanley Hawes Award was established in 1997 to honour Stanley Hawes as first Producer-in-Chief of the Australian National Film Board and Commonwealth Film Unit. The award recognises the significant support he gave independent filmmakers in the documentary sector and is awarded to a person that makes an outstanding contribution to the documentary sector in Australia.

Previous winners

 Graham Chase (1997)
 John Heyer (1999)
 Pat Fiske (2001)
 Stewart Young (2003)
 Robin Hughes (2004)
 CAAMA Productions (2005)
 John Hughes (2006)
 Michael Gissing (2007)
 David Bradbury (2008)
 Bob Connolly (2009)
 Tom Zubrycki (2010)
 Rachael Perkins (2011)
 Julia Overton (2012)
 Documentary Australia Foundation (2013)
 Chris Hilton (2014)
 Pauline Clague (2015)
 Sonya Pemberton (2016)
 Brian Beaton (2017)
 Curtis Levy (2018)
 James Bradley (2019)
 Janine Hosking (2020)
 Michaela Perske (2021)
 David Tiley (2022)

AIDC Awards
On 2021, AIDC announced the inaugural winners  of the AIDC Awards in the following categories:
 Best Feature Documentary 
 Best Documentary/Factual Series 
 Best Documentary/Factual Single, won by Looky Looky Here Comes Cooky, directed and co-written by Steven McGregor, co-written and presented by Steven Oliver 
 Best Short-form Documentary
 Best Audio Documentary 
 Best Interactive/Immersive Documentary

On 18 February 2022 the nominees for the second time were announced, with the winners announced on 9 March 2022.

David and Joan Williams Documentary Fellowship

The David and Joan Williams Documentary Fellowship was established in 2011 by Kim Williams,  former CEO of News Limited, Foxtel and Fox Studios Australia, in honour of his parents. It is intended "to give an independent filmmaker enough money and time to reflect and prepare for his or her next work or to undertake relevant study and research".

The fellowship is given in the form of grants, initially overseen by filmmakers Bob Connolly and Victoria Treole, and administered by the AIDC. The first fellowship was scheduled to be given in June 2011, and was to be awarded annually.

In 2015, the fellowship was worth , and became biennial at the same time as transferring its management to the Documentary Australia Foundation.

Recipients have included Jennifer Peedom, Matthew Bate, Juliet Lamont, Lynette Wallworth, Al Hicks (2015) and Erica Glynn (2017).

References

Further reading
Campey, Philippa (2003) The 2003 Australian International Documentary Conference: A Report

External links

International conferences in Australia
Documentary film organizations
Film organisations in Australia
1987 establishments in Australia
Recurring events established in 1987
Annual events in Australia